Silver fluoride can refer to:

 Silver subfluoride (disilver monofluoride), Ag2F
 Silver(I) fluoride (silver monofluoride, argentous fluoride), AgF
 Silver(II) fluoride (silver difluoride, argentic fluoride), AgF2
 Silver(III) fluoride (silver trifluoride), AgF3
 Silver diamine fluoride, a material used to stop dental caries (cavities).

Gallery